Richard Gilbert Abramson is a film producer.

Filmography

Notes

References

External links

American film producers
Living people
Year of birth missing (living people)